Lewvan Drive and Pasqua Street is a major north–south roadway in west Regina, Saskatchewan. The roadway functions at the western portion of Ring Road; however, unlike Ring Road, it is an arterial road with no interchanges.

Route description

Pasqua Street 
Pasqua Street is divided into two sections. The northern section is a four lane arterial road that runs north from Sherwood Drive, past Ring Road, to an interchange with Highway 11. North of Highway 11, it leaves Regina and passes through the Sherwood Industrial Park before downgrading to a country road. The southern section of Pasqua Street begins at 3 Avenue N (one block south of Sherwood Drive), and is residential street that continues south to Wintergreen Estates (located just north of the Trans-Canada Highway), where it becomes Koester Road. The southern section is discontinuous, divided by two railways and Evraz Place (formerly known as Regina Exhibition Park). Pasqua Street is named after Chief Joseph Pasqua, a Plains Cree chief of the Qu'Appelle Valley in the mid-19th Century. Pasqua is a Cree word for prairie.

Lewvan Drive 
Lewvan Drive is a four lane arterial road that begins at an interchange with the Trans-Canada Highway (Highway 1), travels north past the Regina International Airport, and ends at Sherwood Drive where the roadway continues as the northern section of Pasqua Street. Downtown Regina can be accessed via Saskatchewan Drive. Lewvan Drive is named after Lew Van Ostrand, an early settler south of Regina. When the Grand Trunk Pacific Railway arrived in 1911, the company purchased the townsite from Ostrand and combined the first two parts of his name to name the railroad in his honour.

History 
Pasqua Street originally ran continuous as a collector road through western Regina, but as the city grew it did not have the capacity to function as a major north–south artery. The Lewvan Expressway (later renamed Lewvan Drive) was constructed along a former CN rail line which ran parallel to Pasqua Street, allowing for limited access and grade-separated railway crossings, and was completed in 1984. As part of the project, at-grade railway crossings along Pasqua Street were closed resulting in it being segmented.

Major intersections 
From south to north.

References 

Roads in Regina, Saskatchewan